Komand (also Romanized as Kamand) is a village in Poshtkuh Rural District, in the Central District of Firuzkuh County, Tehran Province, Iran. At the 2006 census, its population was 456, in 98 families.

References 

Populated places in Firuzkuh County